Saran Sirilak (also spelt Saran Siriluksana), better known by his nickname Porshe (born 14 November 1991) is a Thai actor, model and singer. He rose to fame in the action drama Yok Luerd Mungkorn. He is one of the popular television stars in Thailand.

Biography 
Saran was born on 14 November 1991 in  Bangkok, Thailand. He is the eldest son of two siblings. He has one younger sister, named Jiratta Sirilak (จิรัฏฐา ศิริลักษณ์). He has a bachelor's degree from Ramkhamhaeng University and an acting degree from Rangsit University. His hobbies include fitness and basketball.

Filmography

Television Drama

Series Drama

Film

Ost. 
 Dramas :
 Songs :
 Songs :

 Dramas :
 Songs :

Music Video 
 2009 Ruk Dai Ruk Pai Leaw (รักได้รักไปแล้ว) - Four–Mod (RS/YouTube:welovekamikaze) 
 2009 Siang Lom Hai Chai (เสียงลมหายใจ) - Pramote Wilepana (Sony Music Entertainment (Thailand)/YouTube:ปราโมทย์ วิเลปะนะ Official Channel) with Tisanart Sornsuek
 2010  (เพื่อนหรือแฟน ver.2) - Nutty (RS/YouTube:rsfriends) with Monchanok Saengchaipiangpen
 2010  (หากเรายังรักกัน) -  
 2012  (ความรักดีๆ อยู่ที่ไหน) - Peet Peera  (MONO MUSIC/YouTube:E29 MUSIC IDENTITIES) with Pattarasaya Yongrattanamongkol

MC
 2012 : (เส้นทางบันเทิง) On Air Ch.7 
 20 : On Air YouTube:PORSHECLUB Channel

Notes

References

1991 births
Living people
Saran Sirilak
Saran Sirilak
Saran Sirilak
Saran Sirilak
Saran Sirilak
Saran Sirilak
Saran Sirilak
Saran Sirilak
Saran Sirilak
Saran Sirilak
Saran Sirilak
Saran Sirilak
Saran Sirilak